Hammond is an unincorporated community in Bourbon County, Kansas, United States.

History
A post office was established at Hammond in 1877, and remained in operation until it was discontinued in 1968. The community was named for a family of early settlers.

Education
The community is served by Fort Scott USD 234 public school district.

References

Further reading

External links
 Bourbon County maps: Current, Historic - KDOT

Unincorporated communities in Bourbon County, Kansas
Unincorporated communities in Kansas